Heritage Lake is an unincorporated community and census-designated place in Floyd Township, Putnam County, in the U.S. state of Indiana. Its population was 2,880 as of the 2010 census. The community is located in eastern Putnam County on the shores of its namesake lake.  The lake is 318 acres in size.

Geography

Demographics

References

Census-designated places in Indiana
Census-designated places in Putnam County, Indiana